Willibald von Langermann und Erlencamp (29 March 1890 – 3 October 1942) was a German general during World War II. He was a recipient of the Knight's Cross of the Iron Cross with Oak Leaves of Nazi Germany.

Biography
Born in 1890, Erlencamp joined the 5th Dragoon Regiment of the Imperial German Army in 1910. From 1935, he commanded the 4th Cavalry Regiment before an appointment three years later as Higher Cavalry Officer I. He was later made inspector of cavalry and transport. After the commencement of World War II, he was appointed to command Special Administrative Staff 410. In March 1940 he was promoted to generalmajor, just before the Battle of France he was named commander of the 29th Motorized Infantry Division. He successfully led the division through the campaigns in Belgium and France and was awarded the Knight's Cross of the Iron Cross on 15 August 1940. He had received the Iron Cross, 1st and 2nd Classes, earlier in the year.

On 7 September 1940, Erlencamp was given command of the 4th Panzer Division, which he led from the opening stages of Operation Barbarossa up until the closing stages of Operation Typhoon. In January 1942 he was appointed as commander of the XXIV Panzer Corps. Within weeks, he received a promotion to generalleutnant and this was followed in mid-1942 by a further advance in rank to general der panzertruppe. On 17 February 1942 he was awarded the Oak Leaves to the Knights Cross. He was killed in action on 3 October 1942 at Storoshewoje on the Middle Don ("in a foray in the front line").

References

Bibliography

 
 
 
 

1890 births
1942 deaths
Military personnel from Karlsruhe
Generals of Panzer Troops
German Army personnel of World War I
Recipients of the clasp to the Iron Cross, 1st class
Recipients of the Knight's Cross of the Iron Cross with Oak Leaves
German Army personnel killed in World War II
People from the Grand Duchy of Baden
Barons of Germany
Reichswehr personnel
German Army generals of World War II